The 1915–16 William & Mary Indians men's basketball team represented the College of William & Mary in intercollegiate basketball during the 1915–16 season. Under the third year of head coach Dexter W. Draper, the team finished the season with a 7–4 record. This was the 11th season in program history for William & Mary, whose nickname is now the Tribe.

Program notes
It was during the 1916 season that William & Mary sports teams were first referred to as the Indians.

Schedule

|-
!colspan=9 style="background:#006400; color:#FFD700;"| Regular season

Source

References

William & Mary Tribe men's basketball seasons
William And Mary Indians
William and Mary Indians Men's Basketball Team
William and Mary Indians Men's Basketball Team